David A. Smyth (born 5 January 1954) is a British scholar notable for his expertise in the field of Thai studies.

Life
Smyth first studied Thai at the School of Oriental and African Studies, as part of an undergraduate degree in South East Asian Studies. One of his tutors there was E. H. S. Simmonds.

He lived in Thailand from the mid 1970s until the early 1980s, teaching English first at Thammasat University and then at Srinakharinwirot University.

He received his Ph.D. from SOAS in 1988. His doctoral dissertation was a study of the literary works of Kulap Saipradit.

For a number of years, he was a lecturer in Thai and Cambodian at SOAS, and remains a research associate there.

Publications

Books
Smyth, David A., and Manas Chitakasem (1984). Linguaphone Thai Course. London: Linguaphone Institute. .
Smyth, David A. (1995). Teach Yourself Thai. London: Hodder Headline. .
Smyth, David A. (1995). Colloquial Cambodian. Abingdon, Oxfordshire: Routledge. .
Smyth, David A., and Tran Kien (1995). Tuttle Practical Cambodian Dictionary. Rutland, Vermont: Charles E. Tuttle Publishing. .
Smyth, David A. (2002). Thai: An Essential Grammar. London: Routledge. . (Second edition published in 2014. .)
Smyth, David A. (2019). Kulap Saipradit ('Sriburapha'): Journalist and Writer in Early 20th Century Siam. Bangkok: White Lotus Press. .

Papers
Smyth, David A. (1984). "Sībūraphā and Some Ups and Downs in a Literary Career". Paper presented to the International Conference on Thai Studies, Bangkok, 22–24 August.
Smyth, David A. (1987). "The Later Short Stories of Sībūraphā". In Jeremy H. C. S. Davidson (ed.), Laī Sū’ Thai: Essays in Honour of E. H. S. Simmonds, . London: School of Oriental and African Studies.
Smyth, David A. (2001). "Farangs and Siamese: A Brief History of Learning Thai". In M. R. Kalaya Tingsabadh and Arthur S. Abramson (eds.), Essays in Tai Linguistics, . Bangkok: Chulalongkorn University Press.

Translations
Saipradit, Kulap (1990). Behind the Painting and Other Stories. Translated by David A. Smyth. Singapore: Oxford University Press. .
Surangkhanang, K. (1994). The Prostitute. Translated by David A. Smyth. Kuala Lumpur: Oxford University Press. .
Saipradit, Kulap, et al. (1998). The Sergeant's Garland and Other Stories. Translated by David A. Smyth and Manas Chitakasem. Kuala Lumpur: Oxford University Press. .
Korbjitti, Chart (2003). No Way Out. Translated by David A. Smyth. Nakhon Rachasima: Howling Books. .
Navarat, M. R. Nimitmongkol (2009). The Dreams of an Idealist. Translated by David A. Smyth. Chiang Mai: Silkworm Books. .

References

1954 births
Academics of SOAS University of London
Alumni of SOAS University of London
British orientalists
Living people
Thai studies scholars